"Give No Fxk" (pronounced "give no fuck") is a song by American hip hop trio Migos featuring fellow American rappers Travis Scott and Young Thug, released on February 14, 2020. The song originally debuted live in 2019 during Travis Scott's Astroworld Festival. Days before the single's release, its cover art and a snippet of the track were teased on Instagram by Quavo of Migos.

Composition 
"Give No Fxk" is in the key of C# Minor at 146 BPM.

Music video 
The music video was released on February 14, 2020 via YouTube. Directed by Migos member Quavo and Kazakh-Russian filmmaker Aisultan Seitov, the visual has been described as "dystopic" and "psychedelic".

Charts

References 

2020 singles
2020 songs
Migos songs
Young Thug songs
Travis Scott songs
Songs written by Quavo
Songs written by Offset (rapper)
Songs written by Takeoff (rapper)
Songs written by Travis Scott
Songs written by Young Thug
Songs written by Murda Beatz
Song recordings produced by Murda Beatz
Motown singles